Bathynomus affinis is a species of aquatic crustacean of the order Isopoda. It is known from the West Pacific (Philippines).

References

Cymothoida
Crustaceans of the Pacific Ocean
Crustaceans described in 1910